T60 or T-60 may refer to:

 T-60 (scout tank), a light tank produced by the Soviet Union during the 1940s
 Canon T60, a 1990 35mm film-based SLR camera
 Stonewall County Airport, a public airport in Aspermont, Texas, United States; FAA location identifier
 the ThinkPad T60 computer
 a Vox transistor bass amplifier of the 1960s